Nicolasa "Nicol" Garay (September 10, 1873 in Colombia – June 19, 1928 in Panama) was a Panamanian poet. She was the daughter of Colombian painter Epifanio Garay Caicedo and sister of Panamanian musician and political figure Narciso Garay.

Early life 
Nicole was born on September 10, 1873 in Colombia (in a part of the country that would later become Panama). She was the daughter of the Panamanian painter .

Works 
Source:

 Cantinela
 From yesterday to today
 November 3rd
 The Patriot Boy
 Piece of Earth

 Rhyme
 Spleen
 The two prayers

References 

1873 births
1928 deaths
Panamanian poets
Panamanian women writers
19th-century poets
20th-century poets
People from Panama City
Panamanian women poets
20th-century women writers
19th-century women writers
20th-century Panamanian women writers
20th-century Panamanian writers
19th-century Panamanian women writers
19th-century Panamanian writers